was a Japanese novelist, literary critic, and lecturer and translator of French literature who was active during the Shōwa period of Japan. Ōoka belongs to the group of postwar writers whose World War II experiences at home and abroad figure prominently in their works. Over his lifetime, he contributed short stories and critical essays to almost every literary magazine in Japan.

Early life
Ōoka was born in Magome Ward of Tokyo (now part of Shinjuku, Tokyo) to parents from Wakayama prefecture. His father was a stockbroker and his mother was a geisha. Raised to study literature from early childhood, he mastered French while in high school. His parents also hired the famed literary critic Kobayashi Hideo to be his tutor. Under Kobayashi's instruction, he made the acquaintance of poet Nakahara Chūya, the critic , and others who would become well known literary figures. He entered Kyoto Imperial University School of Literature in April 1929, graduating in March 1932.

In 1938, to support himself, he found a job as a translator with Air Liquide (Teikoku Sansō), a Franco-Japanese industrial company based in Kobe. In June 1943, he left their employ, and in November of the same year obtained a position at Kawasaki Heavy Industries.

However, in 1944, he was drafted into the Imperial Japanese Army, given only three months of rudimentary training and sent to the front line at Mindoro Island in the Philippines, where he served as his battalion's communications technician until his battalion was routed and numerous men killed. In January 1945, he was captured by American forces and sent to a prisoner of war camp on Leyte Island. Survival was very traumatic for Ōoka, who was troubled that he, a middle-aged and, to his way of thinking, unworthy soldier, had survived when so many others had not. He returned to Japan at the end of the year and lived at Akashi, Hyōgo.

Literary career
It was not until his repatriation after the war's end that Ōoka began his career as a writer.  On the recommendation of his childhood French tutor and mentor Kobayashi Hideo, he published an autobiographical short-story of his experiences as a prisoner of war entitled Furyoki ("Taken Captive: A Japanese POW's Story", 1948), in three separate parts between 1948 and 1951. Its publication, along with winning the Yokomitsu Riichi Prize in 1949, encouraged him to take up writing as a career.

His next work, Musashino Fujin, ("A Wife in Musashino", 1950), is a psychological novel patterned after the works of Stendhal.

His best-known novel, Nobi (Fires on the Plain, 1951), was also well received by critics, and won the prestigious Yomiuri Prize in 1951. Considered one of the most important novels of the postwar period and based loosely on his own wartime experiences in the Philippines, Nobi explores the meaning of human existence through the struggle for survival of men who are driven by starvation to cannibalism. It was subsequently made into a prize-winning film by Ichikawa Kon in 1959, although the film substantially changes the protagonist's relationship to the theme of cannibalism and Christianity.

In 1958, he veered from his usual subjects and produced Kaei ("The Shade of Blossoms", 1958–1959), depicting an aging, naive nightclub hostess’s struggle and ultimate demise from the destructive forces of desire and wealth in the decadent 1950s Ginza. The setting had changed but the recurring themes had not. His characters were still adrift and struggling for survival in an inhospitable environment.

From 1953 to 1954, he was a Fulbright Visiting Professor at Yale University.  He was also a lecturer on French literature at Meiji University in Tokyo.

In the late 1960s, he revisited the subject of the Pacific War and the Japanese defeat in the Philippines to produce the detailed historical novel Reite senki ("A Record of the Battle of Leyte", 1971). He compiled and researched an enormous amount of information for three years in order to produce it. As with all his writing, it looks at war critically from the perspective of a person who, despite ethical reservations, was forced to serve.

He was invited to become a member of the Japan Art Academy in November 1971 but declined to join, partly, he said, on account of his former experience of soldier and prisoner of war. 

He was awarded the prestigious Asahi Prize in January 1976 and the Mystery Writers of Japan Award in March 1978.

He died in 1988 at the age of 79. His grave is at the Tama Cemetery in the outskirts of Tokyo. He was posthumously awarded a second Yomiuri Prize in 1989 for a biography of Natsume Sōseki.

In October 1994, the Japanese writer Kenzaburō Ōe, when awarded the Nobel Prize of literature, mentioned Shohei Ooka as one of the Japanese writers who "created the way to the Nobel Prize" for him

See also

Japanese literature
List of Japanese authors
The Second Generation of Postwar Writers

References

 Ooka, Shohei. Fires on the Plain. Tuttle Publishing (2001). .
 Ooka, Shohei. Taken Captive: A Japanese POW's Story. Wiley (1996). .
 Ooka, Shohei. The Shade of Blossoms. University of Michigan Press (1998). 
 Ooka, Shohei. A Wife in Musashino. Center for Japanese Studies University of Michigan (2004). .
 Stahl, David C. The Burdens of Survival: Ooka Shohei's Writings on the Pacific War. University of Hawai'i Press (2003). .

External links
 Shohei Ooka at J'Lit Books from Japan 
 Synopsis of A Wife in Musashino (Musashino Fujin) at JLPP (Japanese Literature Publishing Project) 
 Synopsis of Taken Captive (Furyoki) at JLPP (Japanese Literature Publishing Project) 

1909 births
1988 deaths
Kyoto University alumni
20th-century Japanese novelists
Japanese literary critics
Japanese male short story writers
Imperial Japanese Army personnel of World War II
Japanese prisoners of war
Mystery Writers of Japan Award winners
Yomiuri Prize winners
People from Tokyo
20th-century Japanese translators
World War II prisoners of war held by the United States
Imperial Japanese Army soldiers